It's Gonna Be OK may refer to:

It's Gonna Be OK (album), an album by Australian singer Adam Brand 
"It's Gonna Be OK" (Adam Brand song), a single from the album
"(It’s Gonna Be) Okay", a song by The Piano Guys from their 2016 album Uncharted
Also on the 2020 album Music... The Air That I Breathe by Cliff Richard (with The Piano Guys)

See also
Everything's Gonna Be Okay, American comedy television series created by comedian Josh Thomas
"You're Gonna Be OK", a song by Jenn Johnson from 2017 album by Brian & Jenn Johnson from their first album After All These Years